Bernhard Stengele (born 23 April 1963) is a German director, actor, and politician of Alliance 90/The Greens. He has been the co-spokesperson of the party in Thuringia since January 2020. He is a member of the Weimar city council and leader of the Greens group in the council.

Early life
Stengele was born in Wangen im Allgäu, Baden-Württemberg on 23 April 1963, as the third of five children.

Theatre career
Stengele completed his acting training at the Ecole Monika Pagneux et Philipp Gaullier in Paris. After guest engagements at the Teatro itinerante del sol (Düsseldorf/Bogotá), at the Dance Theater Skoronel (Berlin), the Theaterwerkstatt Hannover and at the Deutsches Schauspielhaus (Hamburg), he became a permanent member of the ensemble at the Stadttheater Konstanz in 1992. In 1996 he moved to the Saarland State Theater in Saarbrücken, where he also started directing. In 2001, director Dagmar Schlingmann brought him back to the Stadttheater Konstanz as an actor and director. 
From 2004 to 2012 he was acting director at the Mainfranken Theater Würzburg. From 2012 to 2017 he worked in the same function at the Theater & Philharmonie Thuringia in Altenburg and Gera. Stengele has worked on co-productions with theatres in Burkina Faso, ]Greece, Turkey, and Israel. In 2017. he took over the management of the Summer Theater in Überlingen.

Political career
Stengele ran as candidate for Alliance 90/The Greens in Altenburger Land II in the 2019 Thuringian state election, receiving 5.6% of votes cast, and was not elected. On 25 January 2020, he was elected co-leader of the Thuringian branch of the party, alongside Ann-Sophie Bohm-Eisenbrandt.

On 1 Februar 2023 Stengele succeeded Anja Siegesmund (who resigned for personal reasons) as Thuringia's Minister for the Environment, and also became the second Deputy Minister President in the coalition administration of Bodo Ramelow.

References

1963 births
Living people
Alliance 90/The Greens politicians
21st-century German politicians